KYTX (channel 19) is a television station licensed to Nacogdoches, Texas, United States, serving East Texas as an affiliate of CBS and The CW Plus. Owned by Tegna Inc., the station has studios near Loop 323 in the southeastern portion of Tyler, and its transmitter is located near State Highway 110 in rural east-central Cherokee County (northwest of Ponta).

History
The history of CBS in East Texas traces back to the sign-on of the market's first two television stations, Tyler-based KETX (channel 19) and Longview-based KTVE (channel 32) in 1953; the former station shut down due to financial problems in 1954 while the latter followed suit in 1955. After KLTV (channel 7) signed on in October 1954, it carried select CBS programming as part of a shared primary affiliation with ABC and NBC (eventually becoming a full-time ABC affiliate in 1984). CBS would not have a full-time affiliate in the Tyler–Longview market until September 1984, when KLMG-TV (channel 51, now KFXK-TV) signed on the air from Longview; KLMG disaffiliated from the network in April 1991 to become the market's Fox affiliate. For the thirteen years that followed, viewers in the portion of East Texas that KFXK-TV served had to rely on cable or satellite for CBS programming. Most area cable providers imported Shreveport–Texarkana affiliate KSLA, while some cable systems in the western portion of the market carried the network's Dallas–Fort Worth affiliates (KDFW was carried from 1991 until it switched to Fox in July 1995 while affiliate-turned-O&O KTVT was then carried from that point until early 2004); cable systems in Houston County carried Bryan–College Station affiliate KBTX-TV instead.

KYTX station history

The station first signed on the air on September 1, 1991 as KLSB-TV, operating as a satellite station of NBC affiliate KETK-TV (channel 56). KLSB-TV covered the southern portion of the market while KETK served the northern side. KETK and KLSB-TV were branded as "Region 56" and "Region 19," respectively. Max Media (a company partially related to Max Media Properties, former owner of KETK) purchased the station in 2003. Upon acquiring the station, Max Media signed an affiliation agreement to become the market's CBS affiliate. The company also leased a building in southeast Tyler that formerly operated as a four-screen movie theater to serve as the station's studio facilities. That winter, Max filed an application with the Federal Communications Commission (FCC) to change the station's callsign to KYTX. Channel 19 officially joined CBS on April 12, 2004, broadcasting from the KLSB transmitter; the following day, the FCC officially granted the call sign change to KYTX (the KLSB callsign ended up on a low-power station broadcasting on UHF channel 53, which became the sole repeater of KETK, until it shut down in 2012). The station relocated its transmitter facilities to new tower located south of New Summerfield on June 13, 2004. The new transmitter facilities provided an upgraded signal that allowed KYTX to cover both the Tyler–Longview and Lufkin–Nacogdoches areas. The city of license has remained Nacogdoches.

On October 18, 2007, the station was sold to the Addison-based London Broadcasting Company (owned by former Gaylord Entertainment Company CEO Terry E. London, in association with private equity firm Sun TX Capital Partners) for $25 million.

On May 14, 2014, the Gannett Company announced that it would acquire KYTX and five other London Broadcasting stations in a $215 million all-cash transaction. Gannett's CEO Gracia Martore touted that the acquisition would give the company a presence in several fast-growing markets, and opportunities for local advertisers to leverage its digital marketing platform. Gannett also owns fellow Texas-based CBS affiliates KHOU in Houston and KENS in San Antonio, which the company had acquired in its 2013 purchase of the Belo Corporation. The sale was completed on July 8.

London exempted sister station and MeTV affiliate KCEB (channel 54) from the deal (as well as company flagship KTXD-TV in the Dallas suburb of Greenville), which resulted in the first instance in which a duopoly was legally and operationally separated.

The acquisition closed on July 8, 2014. Under Gannett ownership, the station is held under the same holding company that previously used to own KMOV-TV, which was sold to Meredith Corporation after Gannett's purchase of Belo.

On June 29, 2015, the Gannett Company split in two, with one side specializing in print media and the other side specializing in broadcast and digital media. KYTX was retained by the latter company, named Tegna.

Anchorwoman reality show
KYTX was the center of a reality series on Fox titled Anchorwoman, which filmed at the station's Tyler studios during the spring of 2007. The series starred Lauren Jones (a former beauty pageant winner, The Price Is Right model and featured WWE Diva), who trained to become an anchor at the station. Billboards promoting the program, showing Jones posing provocatively alongside the caption "She's coming," caused controversy across East Texas. The station's participation in the program received attention from many national news outlets including Fox News and Good Morning America, who did stories on the filming of the series.

As the program aired on a competitor of CBS, KYTX temporarily removed CBS branding from most of its signage and equipment until filming of the program wrapped. The program premiered on Fox with back-to-back episodes on August 22, 2007; it was canceled the following day after the series premiere garnered a 2.0 household rating and 1.0 rating among adults between the ages of 18 to 49, according to Nielsen Media Research. In the Tyler–Longview market, local Fox affiliate KFXK-TV aired the program as scheduled, but the station did not sell any advertising during the program to local businesses, opting to use that time to air promotions for local newscasts on sister station KETK-TV as KFXK did not air a local newscast at that time.

Programming

Syndicated programming
Syndicated programs broadcast by KYTX include Family Feud, Sherri and Judge Judy among others.

News operation
KYTX presently broadcasts 26 hours of locally produced newscasts each week (with 4½ hours each weekday, 1½ hours on Saturdays and two hours on Sundays); unlike most CBS affiliates, the station does not presently carry early evening newscasts on Sundays. On September 10, 2018, the station launched a noon newscast for the first time in station history, named The Noon Show.

Shortly after taking the CBS affiliation, Max Media invested in developing a news department for the station. In the interim, during the station's first few months as a CBS affiliate, KYTX resorted to simulcasting local newscasts from the network's Dallas owned-and-operated station KTVT. KYTX debuted its local newscasts on September 12, 2004 (under the original brand of CBS 19 Eyewitness News) with the launch of a weeknight-only 6:00 p.m. newscast. In addition to the 6:00 p.m. program, the station initially offered an hour-long 6:00 a.m. newscast on weekday mornings, and a half-hour late evening newscast at 10:00 p.m. seven nights a week. The following year, KYTX launched a half-hour 5:00 p.m. newscast (originally titled Eye @ 5), which was followed in 2007 by the addition of a 6:30 p.m. newscast that focused on news stories in the Longview and Kilgore areas (similar to a previously attempt at a Longview-centric local newscast that aired on KFXK during its days as a CBS affiliate). The 5:00 p.m. newscast was rebranded as Primetime at 5 that year, while the 10:00 p.m. newscast adopted the Ten @ 10 format in January 2008, focusing on faster delivery of news and weather in the first ten minutes of the newscast. Later in 2008, the station launched a half-hour newscast on Sunday mornings.

In 2009, KYTX dropped the Eyewitness News title for its newscasts in favor of KYTX CBS 19 News. On April 23, 2009, beginning with its weekday morning newscast, KYTX became the first television station in the Tyler–Longview market to begin broadcasting its local newscasts in high definition. Later that year, the station entered into a content partnership with the Tyler Morning Telegraph to collaborate on news stories as well as to provide weather forecasts for the newspaper.

On March 16, 2015, KYTX debuted the Gannett graphics with an updated on-air branding as simply CBS 19 News (dropping the KYTX portion of the branding). CBS 19 currently produces a 2-hour weekday morning show called The Morning Loop, a 30-minute newscast at noon called The Noon Show, a 30-minute newscast at 5 p.m., an hour-long newscast at 6 p.m., and a 35-minute newscast at 10 p.m. These all air during the week. On weekends, CBS 19 produces an hour-long 10 p.m. newscast Saturday and Sunday, an hour-long morning news program (not branded as The Morning Loop) at 7 a.m. on Sundays, and a half-hour pre-recorded weekend newscast at 6 p.m. on Saturdays.

Stormy, the Weather Dog
Stormy, a dog adopted from the Humane Society of Smith County in 2005, served as the station's de facto mascot, "assisting" former chief meteorologist Doc Deason (who later was its weeknight 5:00 p.m. meteorologist) with his weather forecasts during the weeknight newscasts. The idea was inspired by a similar mascot used by Houston NBC affiliate KPRC-TV. Viewers named the dog in a poll; Stormy made his first on-air appearance on November 3, 2005. Sales of "Stormy's Dog-gone Goodwill Dog Cookies" featuring the dog benefitted area humane societies and Goodwill Industries chapters. Stormy no longer appears on KYTX's newscasts.

Technical information

Subchannels
The station's digital signal is multiplexed:

On January 1, 2006, the station launched digital subchannel 19.2 as a UPN affiliate (assuming the network's affiliation in the market from KCEB). Shortly after receiving the affiliation, on January 24, the Warner Bros. unit of Time Warner and CBS Corporation announced that the two companies would shut down The WB and UPN and combine the networks' respective programming to create a new "fifth" network called The CW, which would be aimed at young adults between the ages of 18 and 34. KCEB assumed the CW affiliation, while KYTX-DT2 became an independent station branded as "MYTX" on September 18 after the network ceased operations; "MYTX" eventually became a Retro Television Network affiliate until it affiliated with MeTV on September 19, 2011; the subchannel then switched to The CW in May 2012 (assuming the affiliation with the network's CW Plus service from KCEB, which took the MeTV affiliation).

In 2009, KYTX added Azteca América on digital subchannel 19.3, becoming the first Spanish language network affiliate in East Texas. The subchannel became a This TV affiliate in March 2012. In March 2013, digital channel 19.3 switched its affiliation to Cozi TV (with This TV programming later moving to KCEB on its third digital subchannel). As of 2014, 19.3 switched to MeTV, returning the network to KYTX since 19.2 switched to The CW two years prior.

Analog-to-digital conversion
KYTX signed on its digital signal on UHF channel 18 from a new transmitter tower in Ponta, becoming the first station in the Tyler–Longview market to transmit a full-power digital signal, and the first to offer network programming in high definition on June 12, 2004. The station shut down its analog signal, over UHF channel 19, at 11:59 p.m. on February 17, 2009, the original target date for full-power television stations in the United States to transition from analog to digital broadcasts under federal mandate (which Congress had moved the previous month to June 12). The station's digital signal remained on its pre-transition UHF channel 18, using PSIP to display the station's virtual channel as its former UHF analog channel 19.

As part of the SAFER Act, KYTX kept its analog signal on the air until March 19 to inform viewers of the digital television transition through a loop of public service announcements from the National Association of Broadcasters.

See also
 Channel 15 digital TV stations in the United States
 Channel 19 virtual TV stations in the United States

References

External links
 KYTX ("CBS 19") official website
 KYTX ("MYTX / East Texas CW 19.2") website

CBS network affiliates
The CW affiliates
MeTV affiliates
Twist (TV network) affiliates
Court TV affiliates
Defy TV affiliates
True Crime Network affiliates
Quest (American TV network) affiliates
YTX
Television channels and stations established in 1991
1991 establishments in Texas
Nacogdoches, Texas
Tegna Inc.
Former Gannett subsidiaries